Fabiola da Silva (born June 18, 1979 in São Paulo), nicknamed Fabby, is a Brazilian professional vert skater who competes on the LG Action Sports World Tour. She has received over fifty medals in the LG Action Sports World Tour events. She has received seven X Games gold medals and one silver, making her the most decorated female athlete in X Games history. In a seven-year stretch, she only lost one X Games event, finishing second in 1999.

She has been so dominant against women skaters that she forced the hand of the sport's administrators in respect of limited gender integration of the professional sport: in 2000, the Aggressive Skaters Association created the so-called "Fabiola Rule", which allowed women to compete in the formerly all-male vert competition. Since then, she has placed in the top ten several times in events where she competed against men.

In 2005, she became the first woman ever to land the double back flip on a vert ramp.

Fabiola da Silva features in the three-time Webby Award-winning Book of Cool.

She continues to pursue a world championship.

Competitions 
2009 ASA S3 Supergirl Jam, Venice, CA - Best Trick: 7th
2008 LG Action Sports World Championships, Seattle, WA - Street: Bronze Medalist, Vert: Bronze Medalist
2008 S3 Supergirl Jam, Huntington Beach, CA - Rail Jam: 5th
2007 LG Action Sports World Championships, Dallas, TX - Street: 3rd (female division)
2007 LG Action Sports World Championships, Dallas, TX - Vert: 10th
2007 Action Sports World Tour, San Diego, CA - Vert: 6th
2006 LG Action Sports World Championships, Dallas, TX - Vert: 4th
2006 Action Sports US Vert Championship, San Diego, CA - Vert: 4th
2006 LG Action Sports World Tour, Paris, France - Street: 3rd (female division)
2006 LG Action Sports World Tour, Berlin, Germany - Vert: 6th, Street 4th
2006 LG Action Sports World Tour, Birmingham, England - Vert: 8th, Street: 3rd (female division)
2006 LG Action Sports World Tour, Amsterdam, Netherlands - Street: 2nd (female division)
2006 LG Action Sports World Tour, Amsterdam, Netherlands - Vert: 9th
2006 Action Sports World Tour, Richmond, VA - Vert: 6th
2005 LG Action Sports World Championship, Manchester, England - Vert: 4th
2005 LG Action Sports US Championship, Pomona, CA - Vert: 3rd
2005 LG Action Sports World Tour, Moscow, Russia - Vert: 5th
2005 LG Action Sports World Tour, Munich, Germany - Vert: 5th
2004 Pro Tour Year-End Ranking - Women's Park: 4, Vert: 5
2004 LG Action Sports Championships - World Championships - Women's Park: 1st
2004 Latin X Games - Vert: Silver Medalist
2003 LG Action Sports Championships - World Championships - Women's Park: Silver Medalist
2003 Gravity Games - Men's Vert: 6th
2003 X Games - Women's Park: Gold Medalist
2002 Latin X Games - Vert: Silver Medalist
2001 Pro Tour Year-End Ranking - Women's Street & Park: 1st
2001 ASA World Championships - Women's Street: Silver Medalist
2001 Gravity Games - Women's Vert: 1st, Street 2nd
2001 X Games - Women's Vert: Gold Medalist
2000 X Games - Women's Vert & Park: Gold Medalist
1999 Vert Women (Silver) 2nd
1998 Vert Women (Gold) 1st
1997 Vert Women (Gold) 1st
1996 Vert Women (Gold) 1st

Style
Fabiola is also well known for wearing tank tops, girl's boxer briefs and a nose ring.

Movies
Fabiola da Silva played the stunt double for Gabriella in the movie Brink!.

References

External links

Official Website
Blog site
Blog site
Fabiola in action
EXPN profile
Aggressive Skaters Association profile
Fabiola da Silva related News on Rollernews.com

Vert skaters
1979 births
Living people
X Games athletes